His Lordship may refer to:
 His Lordship (1932 film), a British musical comedy film
 His Lordship (1936 film), a British drama film